Frank Haynes Luxford (3 May 1862, in Wellington – 1 November 1954, in Wellington) was a New Zealand cricketer who played four first-class matches for the Wellington Firebirds in the 1880s.

External links 
  from Cricinfo.

1862 births
1954 deaths
New Zealand cricketers
Wellington cricketers